Iglino is the name of several rural localities in Russia:
Iglino, Republic of Bashkortostan, a selo in Iglinsky Selsoviet of Iglinsky District in the Republic of Bashkortostan; 
Iglino, Vologda Oblast, a village in Bechevinsky Selsoviet of Belozersky District in Vologda Oblast